Big Red Car is the fifth album by Australian band the Wiggles, released in 1995 by ABC Music distributed by EMI. This album won the ARIA Award for Best Children's Album in 1995.

Track listing

AUS track list

US track list

Personnel
Adapted from the album booklet.

The Wiggles
 Murray Cook – bass, guitar, vocals, vibraslap
 Jeff Fatt – piano, Lowrey Colour Glow organ, lead vocal on "I'm a Cow", backing vocals, vibraslap
 Anthony Field – acoustic guitar, vocals, vibraslap co-ordinator
 Greg Page – lead vocals, Hammond B-3, vibraslap

Additional musicians 
 Terry Murray – guitar
 Tony Henry – drums on "Brown Girl in the Ring", "Big Red Car", "Five Little Joeys", "Can You.."
 Andrew Bignall – drums on "Wags the Dog", "Henry's Dance", "Hat on My Head", "Do the Flap", "Teddy Bear Hug"
 Greg Truman – backing vocals on "Wags the Dog", "Henry's Dance",  "Do the Flap", "Hat on My Head",  "Teddy Bear Hug" 
 Gerry Brady – backing vocals on "The Four Presents" and guitar on "Pufferbillies"
 Emma Buter – Character voice
 John Field – sequencing and guitar on "Dorothy's Dance Party"

Video

Big Red Car was made into a video, released in 1995 by the Wiggles. It marks the first appearances of the Big Red Car and the S.S Feathersword, although they were merely cardboard props. This video also debuts Wags the Dog. In the United States, the video was marketed as Dance Party.

Songs and skits
 Can You (Point Your Fingers and Do the Twist?)
 Wags the Dog
 Five Little Joeys
 Di Dicki Do Dum
 I'm a Cow
 Do the Flap
 On Your Holiday
 Hat on My Head
 Greg's Magic Show (The Magic Bag) (skit)
 Brown Girl in the Ring
 Georgia's Song
 Our Boat is Rocking on the Sea
 Nicky Nacky Nocky Noo
 Dorothy's Dance Party
 Big Red Car

Cast
The Wiggles
 Murray Cook
 Jeff Fatt
 Anthony Field
 Greg Page

Also featuring
 Alex Harfield and Jacqui Field as Wags the Dog
 Emma Buter as Dorothy the Dinosaur
 Vanessa Fallon-Rohanna as Henry the Octopus
 Anthony, John, or Paul Field as Captain Feathersword
 Alex Harfield, Mary Ann Hull, Rhiannah Kitching as "Georgia's Song" Dancers

Choreography
 Leanne Halloran
 Assistants: Donna Halloran, Judy Halloran

Release
This video was released on VHS in September 1995 in Australia, and 2001 to the United States.
The DVD was released to the United States on 4 February 2003 under the title Dance Party. In 2018, the video was uploaded on the Wiggles' YouTube channel as the first part on 19 April, the second on 6 May, and the third on 17 May.

Here Comes the Big Red Car

Here Comes the Big Red Car is the 22nd album release from Australian children's music group the Wiggles. It contains tracks that were mostly recorded for the Big Red Car album.

Track listing
 Big Red Car
 Can You (Point Your Fingers and Do the Twist?)
 Wags the Dog
 Five Little Joeys
 Di Dicki Do Dum
 Brown Girl in the Ring
 Sorry Again
 Introduction
 I'm A Cow
 Do the Flap
 Pufferbillies
 Joannie Works with One Hammer
 I Want to Wear the Jacket
 Introduction
 Hat on My Head
 The Four Presents
 Introduction
 Georgia's Song
 I am a Dancer
 Our Boat is Rocking on the Sea
 Nicky Nacky Nocky Noo
 Dorothy's Dance Party
 Henry's Dance
 Sanctissima
 Here We Go Dorothy
 My New Shoes

2006 video

The companion video was released in 2006. DVD extras include a song jukebox, photo gallery, electronic songbook, Dorothy the Dinosaur special announcements, and two episodes of "Lights, camera, action, Wiggles" .

Song list
 Big Red Car
 Can You (Point Your Fingers and Do the Twist?)
 Wags the Dog
 Five Little Joeys
 Di Dicki Do Dum
 I'm a Cow – animated
 Do the Flap
 Hat on my Head
 Brown Girl in the Ring
 Georgia's Song
 I Want to Wear the Jacket
 Our Boat is Rocking on the Sea
 Nicky Nacky Nocky Noo
 Dorothy's Dance Party
 Sorry Again
 Henry's Dance

Personnel
 Vocals: Greg Page, Murray Cook, Jeff Fatt, Anthony Field, Paul Paddick, Emma Buter, Caterina Mete, Brett Clarke, Ryan De Saulnier and Sam Moran,
 Backing Vocals: Murray Cook, Jeff Fatt, Anthony Field, Kevin Bennett, Greg Truman and Gerry Brady
 Guitar: Murray Cook, Anthony Field, John Field, Gerry Brady and Terry Murray
 Bass: Murray Cook and Chris Lupton
 Keyboard: Jeff Fatt and Dominic Lindsay
 Piano Accordion: Dominic Lindsay
 Drums: Tony Henry and Andrew Bignall
 Bouzouki: George Tseros

Notes

References

The Wiggles albums
The Wiggles videos
1995 albums
1995 video albums
2006 albums
2006 video albums
ARIA Award-winning albums
Australian children's musical films